The following events related to sociology occurred in the 2000s.

2000
Zygmunt Bauman's Liquid Modernity is published.
Morris Berman's The Twilight of American Culture is published.
Harriet Bradley's Social Inequalities: coming to terms with complexity is published.
Anthony Giddens' Runaway World is published.
Anthony Giddens' The Third Way and Its Critics is published.
Stuart Hall's The Multicultural Question is published.
Bhikhu Parekh's Report of the Commission of the Future of multi-Ethnic Britain is published.
Robert D. Putnam's Bowling Alone: The Collapse and Revival of American Community is published.
Diane Richardson's Rethinking Sexuality is published.
John Solomos' and Les Back's Theories of Race and Racism; A Reader is published.
Anthony Vidler' Warped Spaces is published.
Malcolm Waters' Inequality after Class is published.
Linda Woodhead's and Paul Heelas' Religion in Modern Times (ed.) is published.

2001
Jean Baudrillard's The Spirit of Terrorism is published.
Raymond Boudon's Origin of values: sociology and philosophy of beliefs is published.
Stan Cohen's States of Denial: Knowing about Atrocities and Suffering is published.
Randy David's Reflections on Sociology and Philippine Society is published by the University of the Philippines Press.
Jay Demerath's Crossing the Gods: World Religions and Worldly Politics is published.
David Frisby's Cityscapes of Modernity: Critical Explorations is published.
John B. Thompson's Political scandal : power and visibility in the media age is published.
Douglas Massey serves as president of the ASA.

2002
Gargi Bhattacharyya's Sexuality and Society is published.
Grace Davie's Europe: The Exceptional Case is published.
Clive Emsley's The History of Crime and Crime Control Institutions is published.
Ian Hacking's Historical Ontology is published.
Stevi Jackson and Sue Scott's Gender: A Sociological Reader is published.
Mike Maguire's Crime Statistics: The Data Explosion and its Implications is published.
David Nelken's White Collar Crime is published.
Barbara F. Reskin serves as president of the ASA.

Deaths
January 23 – Pierre Bourdieu
August 9 – Peter Neville
October 2 – Heinz von Foerster

2003
Steve Bruce's Politics and Religion is published.
Randy David's Nation, Self, and Citizenship: An Invitation to Philippine Sociology is published and wins the National Book Award.
David Downes' and Paul Rock's Understanding deviance: a guide to the sociology of crime and rule breaking is published.
Steven Goldberg's Fads and Fallacies in the Social Sciences is published.
Charles Murray's Human Accomplishment: The Pursuit of Excellence in the Arts and Sciences, 800 B.C. to 1950 is published.

Deaths
October 3 – Neil Postman

2004
Eamonn Carrabine's Criminology is published.
Colin Crouch's Post-Democracy is published.
Paul Gilroy's After Empire: melancholia or convival culture is published.
David Goodhart's Discomfort of Strangers is published.
George Ritzer's Globalisation or Nothing is published.
Moisés Espírito Santo's Five thousand years of Culture at the West - Etno-History of the Popular Religion in the Region of Estremadura is published.

2005
Colin Crouch's Capitalist diversity and change : recombinant governance and institutional entrepreneurs is published.
Liu Xiaobo's The Future of Free China in our Life is published by Labor Reform Foundation.
Michael Mann's The Dark Side of Democracy Explaining Ethnic Cleansing is published.
John B. Thompson's Books in the digital age: the transformation of academic and higher education publishing in Britain and the United States is published.
Viviana Zelizer's The Purchase of Intimacy is published.

Anniversaries
The 50th birthday of Louis Hartz's The Liberal Tradition in America, first published in 1955.

Deaths
April 23: Andre Gunder Frank

2006
Morris Berman's Dark Ages America is published.
Geoff Dencha's, Kate Gavron's and Michael Young's The new East End : kinship, race and conflict is published.
Harvie Ferguson's Phenomenological sociology : insight and experience in modern society is published.
Serge Latouche's How do we learn to want less?The globe downshifted is published.
Richard Sennett's The Culture of the New Capitalism is published.
William Outhwaite's The Future of Society is published.

2007
R. Burrows, M. Savage's The Coming Crisis of Empirical Sociology is published.
Frances Fox Piven serves as president of the ASA.

2008
Arne L. Kalleberg serves as president of the ASA.

2009
Patricia Hill Collins serves as the 100th president of the ASA.

References

Sociology
Sociology timelines
2000s decade overviews